The Odisha Pradesh Congress Committee is the unit of the Indian National Congress for the state of Odisha.

The head office of the organization is the Congress Bhawan, situated at Master Canteen circle in Bhubaneswar. Sarat Pattanayak was appointed president of the committee in 2022 and currently serves as the Odisha Pradesh Congress Committee(OPCC) President.

Odisha Legislative Assembly election

List of Presidents

History

Pre-Independence 1920-1947 
Until 1920, there was no separate provincial committee for Odisha. Congress organisation in Odisha was under Bihar And Orissa Provincial Congress committee . The Nagpur Session of the Indian National Congress, held in December 1920, which finally passed the Non Co-operation resolution was attended by a number of delegates from Orissa such as Pandit Gopabandhu Das, Bhagirathi Mahapatra, Jagabandhu Singh, Jadumani Mangaraj, Mukunda Prasad Das, Niranjan Patnaik and Harekrushna Mahatab. This session of the Congress decided to form the Provincial Congress Committees on linguistic basis. As a result, a separate Provincial Congress Committee was formed for Orissa even though Orissa had not yet became a separate province. Soon after the Nagpur Congress session, the Utkal Union Conference was held at Chakradharpur under the Presidency of Jagabandhu Singh. In this Conference Gopabandhu Das suggested a modification in the outlook of the Utkal Union Conference.

This led to the formation Utkal Pradesh Congress Committee uniting representation of all Odia speaking tracts, consisting of British administered Madras Presidency, Central Province, Bengal Presidency and the pre 1936 Bihar and Orissa Province. With its first President being Utkalamani Gopabandhu Das the formation of Utkal Pradesh Congress Committee (UPCC) gave impetus to formation of Odisha state. This also gave boost to Congress activities in the Odia speaking areas.

The Utkal Pradesh Congress Committee deputed the following twelve members to represent Orissa at the All India Congress Committee. They were Gopabandhu Das, Jagabandhu Singh, Nilakantha Das, Gopabandhu Choudhury, Niranjan Pattanaik, Harekrushna Mahatab, Bhagirathi Mahapatra, Dharanidhar Mishra Banaprastha, Nilakantha Das Choudhury, Atal Bihari Acharya, Brajamohan Panda and Jamini Kanta Biswas.

UPCC gave boost to formation of Orissa state. In 1931 UPCC adopted a resolution moved by Harekrushna Mahatab, that urged the Government of India to establish a separate Orissa state. It also established a committee to take the matter further and cooperate with the British administration without compromising Congress principles.

See also
 Indian National Congress
 Congress Working Committee
 All India Congress Committee
 Pradesh Congress Committee

References

External links
 
Odisha Pradesh Congress Committee on Facebook

Indian National Congress by state or union territory
Politics of Odisha